Dracophyllum patens, commonly called Great Barrier Inaka, is a species of plant in the family Ericaceae that is endemic to New Zealand.

References

patens
Flora of the North Island
Endemic flora of New Zealand